USS Pearl (SP-1219) was a United States Navy patrol vessel in commission from 1917 to 1918.

Pearl was built as a private motorboat of the same name in 1912 by W. H. Saunders. On 23 August 1917, the U.S. Navy acquired her from her owner for use as a section patrol boat during World War I. She was commissioned as USS Pearl (SP-1219) and assigned to "special duty."  Pearl was returned to her owner on 23 December 1918.

Notes

References
 SP-1219 Pearl at Department of the Navy Naval History and Heritage Command Online Library of Selected Images: U.S. Navy Ships -- Listed by Hull Number "SP" #s and "ID" #s -- World War I Era Patrol Vessels and other Acquired Ships and Craft numbered from SP-1200 through SP-1299
 NavSource Online: Section Patrol Craft Photo Archive Pearl (SP 1219)

Patrol vessels of the United States Navy
World War I patrol vessels of the United States
1912 ships